The Sudanese Ambassador in Beijing is the official representative of the Government of in Khartoum to the Government of the People's Republic of China.

List of representatives

References 

Ambassadors of Sudan to China
China
Sudan